Holocompsa is a genus of hairy sand cockroaches in the family Corydiidae. It is the only genus in the subfamily Holocompsinae.

References 

Cockroach genera